Statistics of Nemzeti Bajnokság I for the 1912–13 season.

Overview
It was contested by 10 teams, and Ferencvárosi TC won the championship.

League standings

Results

References
Hungary - List of final tables (RSSSF)

1912-13
1
1912–13 in European association football leagues